Angélica Dass (born 1979) is a Brazilian photographer based in Madrid, Spain and the creator of the photographic project Humanæ. With this project, she has created portraits of many different people from all over the world, showing a wide range of age groups, skin colors and personal backgrounds. Her aim is to invite viewers to recognize the similarity of humans, regardless of individual differences.

In March 2016, Dass gave a TED talk called "The beauty of human skin in every color" about how skin colors "make us see each other as different, even though we are equal."

Biography 
Angélica Dass was born in Rio de Janeiro, Brazil, in 1979 and is based in Madrid, Spain. She combines her photographic work with sociological investigation and public participation as a contribution to human rights all over the world.

Work 
Angelica Dass's work goes beyond photographic exhibitions and is also used in classrooms or open spaces to create public awareness. She also has presented her photographic work at universities, such as the University of Salamanca, the University of Bologna, or the UERJ - Rio de Janeiro, as well as at venues such as the Tate Modern and the World Economic Forum.

Project Humanæ 

In 2012, Dass started her project Humanæ as a work-in-progress while studying at Spain's ETI. She began with  portrait photographs of her Spanish husband, herself and their families. By matching a strip of pixels from the nose of a person's photograph to color cards from the Pantone color system, she has created a catalog of human skin colors that are displayed as a collage of Pantone portraits. This display is intended to create awareness about how we see each other and how we view race, ethnicity and identity It  includes over 4,000 pictures of people in  more than 17 countries and 27 cities around the world. 

Humanæ is presented as a traveling exhibition and has been shown, among other places, in Spain, South Korea; Italy, Israel, the United Kingdom, Canada and the United States, and at Habitat III, the UN Conference on Housing and Sustainable Urban Development, in Quito, Ecuador.

In February and March 2022, an open air exhibition of her portraits was shown at the Gare du Nord in Paris, France, with several panels of individual portraits and two extra large pictures at the exterior of the train station.

References

External links 

 Official webpage

1979 births
Living people
21st-century photographers
21st-century Brazilian women artists
21st-century Brazilian artists
21st-century women photographers
Artists from Rio de Janeiro (city)
Brazilian photographers
Portrait photographers
Brazilian women photographers